The word Mahakavi or Maha Kavi is an honorific and means "Great Poet".
This may refer to:

Poets 
 Kālidāsa, a 5th-century Sanskrit playwright and epic poet
 Vidyapati (1352–1448), also known as Maithil Kavi Kokil (the poet cuckoo of Maithili language), a Maithili poet and Sanskrit writer
 Subramania Bharati  (1882–1921), was a Tamil writer, poet and journalist, and Indian independence activist and social reformer from Tamil Nadu. Popularly known as "Mahakavi Bharatihiyar", he was a pioneer of modern Tamil poetry and is considered one of the greatest Tamil literary figures of all time. 
 Moyinkutty Vaidyar (1852–1892), a Muslim Malayalam poet of the Mappila pattu genre
 Kumaran Asan (1873–1924), one of the modern triumvirate poets of Malayalam
 Ulloor S. Parameswara Iyer (1877–1949), one of the modern triumvirate poets of Malayalam
 Vallathol Narayana Menon (1878–1958), one of the modern triumvirate poets of Malayalam
 K.V. Simon (1883–1944), a Christian Malayalam poet, Sanskrit scholar and polyglot
 Puthencavu Mathan Tharakan (1903–1993), a Christian Malayalam poet
 P. C. Devassia (1906–2006), a Christian Sanskrit scholar and poet
 Laxmi Prasad Devkota (1909–1959), a Nepali poet.
 Gurajada Apparao (1862-1915), a playwright, dramatist, poet, and writer; His  play Kanyasulkam is considered as the greatest play in the Telugu language.
 Dasu Sriramulu (1846-1908), a scholar, dramatist, poet, orator and writer. Author of several literary works - kavyalu, Satakas, plays, lyrics for musical and dance compositions. He translated many satakams and plays from Sanskrit in Telugu. Sri Andhra Devi Bhagavatamu was his an acclaimed literary work in 6000 poems and completed in six months.

Television Series 
 Mahakavi Series, a television documentary series anchored by poet Kumar Vishwas during 2016